The Weres was an amulet that symbolically represented the pillow or headrest under the head of an Egyptian mummy. They were placed under the mummy's head to protect it from damage. The Weres amulet was often inscribed with a spell which read: "Their enemies have no power to cut off the heads of the deceased. The deceased shall cut off the heads of their enemies." Weres amulets were sometimes placed in mummy wrappings to magically protect and lift the head of the deceased.

Chapter 125 of the Egyptian Book of the Dead refers to the headrest:

References

Egyptian artefact types